This is a list of non-Malaysian footballers who currently plays or have played football in Malaysia.

Players in bold indicate players currently playing in the Malaysian football league system. Flags represent the player's country of birth, in case it is different from his main nationality.

Asia – AFC

Afghanistan
 Faysal Shayesteh - (Pahang FA) - 2016
 Mustafa Zazai - (Kelantan FA) - 2019

Australia

  Abbas Saad – (Johor FA & Singapore Lions)
 Alistair Edwards – (Sarawak FA, Selangor FA, Johor FA & Singapore Lions)
 Andrew Clark – (Kedah FA)
  Aytek Genç – (Johor FC)
 Darren Stewart – (Johor FA)
  Gabriel Mendez – (Kedah FA)
 Craig Foster – (Singapore Lions)
 Warren Spink – (Singapore Lions)
 Greg Owens – (Johor FC)
 James Monie – (Kedah FA)
 Jonathan Ben Angelucci – (Johor FC)
 Milan Blagojevic – (Johor FA)
 Tony Gasparetto
 Travis Dodd
 Robert Gaspar – (Sabah FA)
 Joe Caleta – (Perak FA)
 Marshall Soper – (Penang FA & Perak FA)
  Robert Dunn – (Selangor FA)
 Ross Greer – (Selangor FA)
  David Mitchell – (Selangor FA)
  Josip Biskic – (Malacca FA)
  Mehmet Durakovic – (Selangor FA)
 Ross Aloisi – (Selangor FA)
 Ante Kovacevic – (Selangor FA)
 Matthew Bingley- (Pahang FA)
 Ante Milicic- (Pahang FA)
 Simon Colosimo- (Pahang FA)
 Gus Cerro- (Negeri Sembilan FA & (Pahang FA)
 Alan Edward Davidson – (Pahang FA)
 Scott Ollerenshaw – (Negeri Sembilan FA & (Sabah FA)
 David Evans – (Sarawak FA)
  Billy Bone – (Sarawak FA)
  Craig Naven – (Sarawak FA)
 Jeff Curran – (Sarawak FA)
 Doug Ithier – (Sarawak FA)
 PJ Roberts – (Sarawak FA)
 Mark Rudan – (Public Bank FC)
 Scott O'Donell – (Kuala Lumpur FA)
 Peter Tsolakic – (Malacca FA)
 John Tambouras- (Pahang FA)
 Michael Santalab
 Nick Bosevski
 Zeljko Babic
  Boris Ovcin
 Dean Hefferman
 Michael Baird – (Sabah FA) – 2012
 Brendan Gan – (Sabah FA) – 2012
 Geoff Dwyer – (Penang FA)
 Tommy Maras – (Kuala Lumpur FA)
 Dean Milner – (Kuala Lumpur FA)
 Vassillios Kalegeracos – (Kuala Lumpur)
 Dimitri Petratos – (Kelantan) – 2013
 Spase Dilevski – (Armed Forces) – 2013
 Steve Pantelidis – (Selangor) - 2013
Mario Karlović – (Terengganu), (Armed Forces), (Kuala Lumpur) - 2013, 2014–15, 2016-2017
 Adam Griffiths – (Selangor), (Kedah) - 2012-13, 2013
 Adriano Pellegrino – (Kedah) - 2013-14
 Srećko Mitrović – (Sabah) – 2013
 Ryan Griffiths – (Sarawak) – 2014
  Ndumba Makeche - (FELDA United F.C.) - 2014-15, (Sarawak FA) - 2016, (Perlis) - 2017-18, (Penang FA) - 2019
 Goran Šubara – (T-Team F.C.) – 2014
 Mohammad Naeem Rahimi – (DRB-Hicom) – 2014
 Emile Damey – (DRB-Hicom) – 2014
 Alexander Thomas Becerra – (Penang Water Supply Board) – 2014
 Jonathan McKain – (Kelantan) – 2014-2016
Robert Cornthwaite – (Selangor) – 2014-2016 (Perak) - 2018
 Brent Griffiths – (Penang) – 2016
 Taylor Regan – (Negeri Sembilan) – 2015-2016, - (Selangor FA) - 2019-
 Joel Chianese – (Negeri Sembilan) – 2015-2016
 Andrew Nabbout – (Negeri Sembilan) – 2015-2016
 Zac Anderson - (Kedah FA) - 2017, - (PKNS F.C.) - 2018, - (Perak FA) - 2019.
 Antony Golec - (Perak) - 2020-

Brunei

  Mohd Nazmi Osman – (Sabah FA)
 Adi Said - (UiTM F.C.) - 2019

China

 Jia Xiuquan – (PDRM FA) – 1991–92
 Zhu Bo - (PDRM FA) - 1991-1992

Cambodia

 Chan Vathanaka - (Pahang FA) - 2018, - (PKNS FC) - 2019
 Keo Sokpheng - (PKNP F.C.) - 2018
 Prak Mony Udom - (Negeri Sembilan) - 2018
  Thierry Bin - (Terengganu F.C.) - 2018-19,
(Perak FA) 2020-

Guam
  John Matkin - (UiTM FC) - 2016

Hong Kong

  Tim Bredbury – (Selangor FA & Sabah FA) - 1992,1993
  Ross Greer – (Selangor FA) - 1992-1993
  Andy Russell – (Penang FA) - 2017

Indonesia

 Ristomoyo Kassim- (Selangor FA)
 Robby Darwis- (Kelantan FA)
 Ponaryo Astaman- (Telekom Melaka FC)
 Elie Aiboy – (Selangor FA) - 2005
 Bambang Pamungkas – (Selangor FA) - 2005
 Kurniawan Dwi Yulianto – (Sarawak FA)
 Eri Irianto – (Kuala Lumpur FA)
 Fachry Husaini – (Kuala Lumpur FA)
 Budi Sudarsono – (MPPJ FC & PDRM FA)
 Hamka Hamzah - (PKNS) - 2013
 Patrich Wanggai – (Kuala Terengganu) - 2013
 Andik Vermansyah – (Selangor FA) - 2013-2017 & (Kedah) - 2018
 Dedi Kusnandar – (Sabah) - 2016
 Steven Imbiri - (MISC-MIFA) - 2017
 Evan Dimas - (Selangor FA) - 2018
 Ilham Armaiyn - (Selangor FA) - 2018
 Ferdinand Sinaga - (Kelantan FA) - 2018
 Achmad Jufriyanto - (Kuala Lumpur FA) - 2018
 David Laly - (Felcra FC) - 2018
 Saddil Ramdani - (Pahang FA) - 2019
 Rian Firmansyah - (Sarawak FA) - 2019

India

 Baichung Bhutia – (Perak FA) - 2003

Iran
 Alireza Abbasfard – (Sarawak) - 2014
 Misagh Bahadoran – (Perak) - 2018
 Milad Zeneyedpour - (UKM F.C.) - 2019-

Iraq

 Riyadh Abbas – (Kelantan & Johor Darul Ta'zim II) - 1996
 Hussein Alaa Hussein – (Kelantan) - 2014

Japan

 Dan Ito – (Penang FA) - 2005
 Hiroyuki Ishida – (Johor FC) - 2005-06
 Sasa Yusuki – (Sarawak FA) and (Sabah FA)
 Shataro Hattori - (DRB-Hicom) - 2014
 Terukazu Tanaka - (DRB-Hicom) - 2015
 Keisuke Ogawa - (PKNS) - 2015
(Sabah FA) - 2018
 Shunsuke Nakatake - (Kuantan FA) - 2016-2017, - (PDRM FA) - 2018, - (Negeri Sembilan FA) - 2019-
  Bruno Suzuki - (Negeri Sembilan FA) - 2017, (Terengganu II F.C.) - 2018-

Kyrgyzstan

 Pavel Matiash – (UiTM FC) - 2016
 Bakhtiyar Duyshobekov - (Kelantan FA) - 2018
   Edgar Bernhardt - (Kedah FA) - 2019

Lebanon

 Fadel Antar – Kelantan – 2022–present
 Rabih Ataya – UiTM, Kedah Darul Aman – 2020–2021
  Samir Ayass – Perak – 2021–present
 Hassan Chaito – Terengganu – 2014–2015
 Zakaria Charara – Kelantan, Kuala Lumpur – 2012
  Hassan Daher – Perak – 2014
 Ramez Dayoub – Selangor – 2011–2013
  Hussein El Dor – Perak – 2019
  Buddy Farah – Selangor – 2005–2006
 Mohamad Ghaddar – Kelantan, Felda United, Johor Darul Ta'zim, Johor Darul Ta'zim II – 2012–2014, 2017–2019
  Hilal El-Helwe – Penang – 2022–present
 Mootaz Jounaidi – FELDA United – 2017
 Khalil Khamis – Pahang – 2020
 Abou Bakr Al-Mel – Kelantan, UiTM – 2017, 2020–2021
  Hassan El Mohamad – Sarawak – 2014
  Newton – Penang – 2006–2007
 Jad Noureddine – Perak – 2018, 2021

Maldives

 Ali Ashfaq – (DPMM FC) - 2007-08, (PDRM FA) - 2013-2016
 Ibrahim Fazeel – (DPMM FC) - 2007-2008

Myanmar

 Kyi Lwin – (Perak FA)
 Aung Naing – (Perak FA)
 Win Aung – (Singapore Lions)
 Aun Tun Tun
 Kyaw Zayar Win - (Perak) - 2014
 Hein Htet Aung - (Selangor) - 2021

Nepal

 Rohit Chand – (T-Team F.C.) - 2016

Philippines

  Mark Hartmann – (Sarawak) - 2017
  Omid Nazari – (Melaka United) - 2017
  Iain Ramsay - (Felda United) - 2018
  Álvaro Silva - (Kedah FA) - 2018
  Ángel Guirado - (Negeri Sembilan FA) - 2018
  Patrick Reichelt - (Melaka United) - 2019
  Luke Woodland - (Kuala Lumpur FA) - 2019- 
  Joshua Grommen - (Petaling Jaya City F.C.) - 2019
 Amani Aguinaldo - (PKNP F.C.) - 2019-
 Adam Michael Reed - (Pahang FA) - 2020

Palestine

  Matias Jadue – (PKNS) - 2016
  Yashir Pinto – (Melaka) - 2016, (Perak) - 2017, (PKNP F.C.) - 2019-

Pakistan

 Zesh Rahman – (Pahang) - 2014-2016

Singapore

 V Sundramoorthy – (Kedah FA, Kelantan FA & Pahang FA)
 K. Kannan – (Kuala Lumpur)
 Abdul Malek Awab – (Kuala Lumpur FA & PDRM FA)
 Fandi Ahmad – (Kuala Lumpur FA & Pahang FA)
 Borhan Abu Samah – (Pahang FA)
 Ahmad Latiff Khamaruddin – (PDRM FA & Johor FA) – 2007–08, 2005
 Aide Iskandar – (Johor FA)
 R.Suriamurthy- (Pahang FA)
 Terry Pathmanathan – (Pahang FA)
 Hasnim Haron – (Johor FA)
 Mohd Noh Alam Shah – (PDRM FA) – 2007–08
  Agu Casmir – (PDRM FA)
 George Lee – (Kuala Lumpur FA)
 Faliq Abdulkader – (Malacca FA)
 Baihakki Khaizan – (Johor Darul Takzim),  (Johor Darul Takzim II) - 2013-14, 2015
 Hariss Harun- (Johor Darul Takzim) - 2013-17, 2019-
 Shahril Ishak – (Johor Darul Takzim II) - 2013
 Fazrul Nawaz – (Sabah) - 2015
 Safuwan Baharudin – (PDRM FA) - 2016, (Pahang FA) - 2018-
 Hafiz Sujad - (Johor Darul Takzim II) - 2018
 Shahdan Sulaiman - (Melaka United) - 2018
 Faris Ramli - (PKNS F.C.) - 2018, (Terengganu F.C.) - 2020-

Syria
 Mahmoud Amnah - Sime Darby - 2013-14
 Marwan Sayedeh - Sabah - 2013-14

South Korea

 Jang Jung – (Perak FA) – 1990–91
 Yun Woon-chul - (Telekom Malacca) - 2006-07
 Jeon Kyung-Joon – (DPMM FC)
 Kim Dong-Chan - PKNS - 2013-14
 Park Yong-Ho - Armed Forces - 2014
 Kwon Jun - DRB-Hicom, Putrajaya SPA - 2014, 2015
 Namgung Woong - Kedah, Perak - 2014, 2015
 Kim Jin-Yong - Negeri Sembilan, DRB-Hicom - 2014, 2016
 Lee Kil-Hoon - Penang, Sime Darby, Sabah - 2014, 2016, 2017 - 2018
 Lee Kwang-Hyun - Penang FA, Kuantan - 2014, 2015
 Bang Seung-Hwan - UiTM, Kedah - 2014, 2015-2016
 Choi Hyun-yeon - Kuala Lumpur United - 2015
 Im Kyung-hyun - Kuantan - 2015
 Shin Jae-pil - Melaka United - 2016
 Ha Dae-won - Sime Darby - 2016
 Kang Jin-wook - UiTM - 2016
 Kim Do-heon - (Negeri Sembilan FA) - 2018-
 Jeon Woo-young - (Melaka United) - 2017 - 2018
 Lee Chang-hoon - (Melaka United) - 2018, (PDRM FA) - 2019-
 Nam Se-in - (UKM F.C.) - 2018
 Lee Jun-hyeob - (Terengganu F.C.) - 2018
 Do Dong-hyun - 2017 - (UiTM F.C.), (Kelantan FA) - 2018, (Terengganu F.C.) - 2018
 Kang Seung-jo - (Penang FA) - 2018-
 Kim Chi-gon - (Sarawak FA) - 2018
 Park Tae-soo - (Sabah FA) - 2019-
 Hwang Sin-young - (Selangor United FC) - 2019-
 Park Yong-joon - (UiTM F.C.) - 2019-
 Heo Jae-Won - (Pahang Fa) - 2019-

Thailand

 Attapol Buspakom- (Pahang FA)
 Piyapong Pue-on- (Pahang FA)
 Vitoon Kijmongkolsak- (Pahang FA & Penang FA)
 Chatchaval Kenjanahoot -(Negeri Sembilan FA)
 Adisak Kraisorn- (Terengganu) 2023

 Choketawee Promrut – (Johor FA)
 Kiatisuk Senamuang- (Perlis FA)
 Suriya Domtaisong – (Kelantan FA)
 Ronnachai Sayomchai- (Pahang FA)
 Sarif Sainui – (Kelantan FA)
 Worrawoot Srimaka – (Kelantan FA)
 Praduphan Jarunnya
 Wittawin Chowuttiwat - Perlis - 2013-14
  Kittiphong Pluemjai - (PKNS F.C.) - 2019
 Sanrawat Dechmitr - (Kedah Darul Aman) 2022

Uzbekistan

 Azamat Abduraimov- (Pahang FA)
 Igor Shkvyrin- (Pahang FA)
 Moustava Belialov – (Perak FA)
 Shukhrat Khalmirzaev – (Perak FA)
 Rustam Abdulloev- (Perlis FA)
 Viktor Makarov – (Kuala Lumpur FA)
 Kudrat Madaninov - (Terengganu FA)
 Alexander Kochokov - (Terengganu FA)
 Dilshod Sharofetdinov - (Sime Darby), (Terengganu II) - 2013-15, 2016
 Yaroslav Krushelnitskiy - (Felda United) - 2013
 Sadriddin Abdullaev - (Kuala Terengganu) - 2015
 Farhod Tadjiyev - (Kuala Terengganu) - 2015
 Lutfulla Turaev - (Felda United) - 2016
 Vokhid Shodiev - (Sarawak) - 2016
 Pavel Purishkin - (UiTM FC) - 2016
 Bobirjon Akbarov - (Kuala Lumpur FA) - 2017-18
 Sanjar Shaakhmedov - (Terengganu FC) - 2019-20
 Sherzod Fayziev - (Sri Pahang) - 2022-

Turkmenistan 
  Serdar Geldiýew - (PDRM FA) - 2020
  Şöhrat Söýünow - (PDRM FA) - 2020

Vietnam

  Michal Nguyen - (Selangor FA) - 2019

Africa – CAF

Angola

  Frederico de Castro Roque dos Santos – (Negeri Sembilan FA)

Burkina Faso

 Abdoulaye Traoré – (Perak FA)
 Romeo Kambou – (Sarawak FA)

Cameroon

 Richard Bohomo – (Kuala Muda Naza FC)
 Emile Mbouh – (Perlis FA & Kuala Lumpur FA)
 Basile Essa Mvondo
 Bernard Tchoutang – (Pahang FA)
 Alain Njoh Njoh Mpondo
 Viban Francis Bayong – (DPMM FC)
 Jean Black Ngody – (Perlis FA)
 Matthew Andongcho Mbuta – (DPMM FC)
 Moudourou Moise – (Johor FC)
 Christian Bekamenga – (Negeri Sembilan FA & PKNS FC))
 Eric Arsène Bayemi Maemble – (Felda United FC)

Ivory Coast

 Edward Koffi Quassy
 Diarra Bakary
 Noel Kipre – (Perak FA)
 Kipré Tchétché - (Terengganu F.C.) - 2017-19, (Kedah FA)  - 2020-

Egypt
 Mohamed Shawky

Gambia
 Mamadou Danso - (Kelantan) - 2017 & (UiTM F.C.) - 2018-

Ghana

 Emmanuel Kofi Ampiah Pahang FA
 Impraim Godfred Attah
 Isaac Kuffour – (Melaka TMFC)
 Abukari Damba – (Perak FA)
 Seidu Issifu – (Terengganu FA)
 Kim Tyrone Grant – Sarawak FA)
 David Annas PDRM FA
 Baba Iddi – (Perak FA)
 Haruna Al-Hassan
 Henry Acquah – (Perlis FA)
  Robert Eshun – (Sarawak FA)

Guinea

 Keita Mandjou - (Perak FA)
 Ballamodou Conde – (Penang FA)

Guinea-Bissau

 Fernando Manuel Co - (Sarawak FA)

Kenya

 Hillary Echesa – (PDRM FA & MP Muar FC)
 John Baraza – (PDRM FA)
 Bernard Shanggi
 Harrison Eric Muranda

Liberia

 Frank Jean Seator – (Perak FA & Selangor FA)
 Samuel Chebli – (Perak FA)
 Alexander Freeman – (Kelantan FA (1995–1996), Perlis FA & Selangor FA)
 Mass Sarr, Jr. – (Selangor FA)
 Josiah Seton – (Sabah FA & Pahang FA)
 Lamie T Kiawu
 Edmond Kingston – (Selangor FA & ATM FA)
 Arcadia Toe – (Kelantan JPS FC)
  Keita Mandjou – (Perak FA & Kelantan FA (2013))
 Francis Doe - Terengganu FA (2012), Selangor FA (2013), Kelantan FA (2014), Negeri Sembilan FA (2015) Felda United (2016) Selangor FA (2017) Pahang FA (2018)
 Patrick Wleh - Sime Darby FC (2012) & PKNS FC (2013–2017) Selangor FA (loan) (2016), (PDRM FA) - 2019-
 Zah Rahan Krangar - Felda United - 2014-17
 Edward Junior Wilson - Felda United - 2014
  Patrick Gerhardt - (Sarawak FA) - 2015

Mauritania

  Dominique Da Sylva - (Terengganu F.C.) - 2020-

Morocco

 Merzagua Abderrazak – (Penang FA)
 Tarik El-Janaby – (Pahang FA, Kuantan FA )
 Rachid Zmama – (MPPJ FC)
 Fidadi Mohamed – (Selangor FA)
 Abdel Hakim El-Bahloul
 Mohammed Akrane - (Perlis FA)
 Mohamed Borji - (Pahang FA)
 Redouane Zerzouri - (UKM F.C.) - 2018

Namibia

 Paulus Shipanga – (Sabah FA)
 Lazarus Kaimbi - (Pahang FA) - 2019
 Petrus Shitembi - (Terengganu FC) - 2021-

Niger

 Mohammed Muyei – (Kelantan FA)

Nigeria

 MacPherlin Dudu Omagbemi – (Penang FA)
 Olubunmi Adigun – (Kedah FA)
 Peter Nieketien – (Kedah FA & Terengganu FA)
 Yahaya Yakubu
 Stephen Keshi – (Perlis FA)
 Victor Ogunsanya – (Kuala Lumpur FA)
 Aiyajunoni Emola
 Igwe Iroha
 Abdulafees Abdulsalam-Perak FA 2014, ATM FA 2015
 Charles Obi
 Abdullahi Nasiru
 Binawari Williams Ajuwa - Pahang FA
 Nduka Ugbade – (Perak FA)
 Abdulrazak Ekpoki – (Negeri Sembilan FA)
 Abdul Lateef Seriki
 Anicet Eyenga – (PKNS FC)
 Uchenna Eze
 Agu Ndubuisi
 Dickson Nwakaeme – (Kelantan FA) - 2013 (Pahang FA) - 2014-2015, 2019-
 Obinna Nwaneri – Kelantan FA 2012-2014 (ATM FA) - 2015
 Michael Ijezie - (UKM F.C.) - 2018-
 Waheed Oseni - (UKM F.C.) - 2018
 Akanni-Sunday Wasiu - (UiTM F.C.) - 2017 - (Terengganu II F.C.) - 2018-

South Africa

 Junaid Hartley – (Sarawak FA)
 Christopher Zwane Mandla-(Selangor FA)
 Dumisa Ngobe – (Sabah FA)

Senegal

 Kane Mamadou Maryam Diallo – (Kedah FA)
 Matar Diop
 Mamadou Diallo – (Pahang FA)
 Mohamed Moustapha N'diaye – (Kelantan FA (2007–2008))
 El Hadji Diouf - (Sabah FA) - 2015

Sierra Leone

 Lamine Conteh – (Perlis FA & Negeri Sembilan FA)
 Henry Lewis
 Alhaji Kamara - (Johor Darul Ta'zim F.C.) - 2015

Sudan

 Ahmed El-Sayed Al-Fatih

Togo

 Alfa Potowabawi – (Terengganu FA)
 Raphaël Patron Akakpo – (Brunei FA)

Uganda

 Arbade Bironze – (Pahang FA)

Zambia

 Chaswe Nsofwa – (Melaka TMFC)
 Emmanuel Zulu – (Perak FA)
 Chanda Bwalya – (Terengganu FA)
 Kabwe Kamuzati – (Perlis FA)
 Phillimon Chepita – (Perlis FA & PKNS FC)
 Zachariah Simukonda – (Perlis FA & PBDKT T–Team FC)
 Owen Mwendabai – (Perlis FA)
 Kelvin Mazungu – (Perlis FA)
 Evans Chisulo – (Selangor FA)

Zimbabwe

 Newton Ben Katanha
 Neathan Gibson

Europe – UEFA

Armenia
 Karen Harutyunyan - Terengganu FA - 2016

Bulgaria

  Dimitre Kalkanov – Selangor FA – 1994
 Atanas Pashev – Kuala Lumpur FA – 1993

Bosnia and Herzegovina

 Esad Sedjić
 Elvis Ćorić
 Milomir Šešlija – Kuala Lumpur FA, Sabah FA – 1992–93, 1993–98
 Veselin Kovačević – Sabah FA
 Anto Grabo – Kuala Lumpur FA – 1990–92
 Bojan Petrić – T-Team FC – 2011–12
 Dalibor Dragic – Johor Bahru City FC – 2012
 Muamer Salibašić (Sarawak) - 2014

Croatia

 Ervin Boban – Johor – 1995
 Vedran Kukoč – Perak FA – 2005–07
 Marin Mikac – UPB-MyTeam FC
 Mijo Dadić
 Dejan Miljanić – UPB-MyTeam FC
 Ivica Kulašević – Selangor FA – 2002–03
 Darko Novačić – Selangor FA – 2003–04
 Daniel Kovačević
 Goran Vujanović
 Joško Farac – Perak FA
 Igor Tolić
 Mario Mijatović
 Zdravko Šimić – Sabah FA
 Rene Komar
 Matej Bogdanovic – UPB-MyTeam FC
 Miljan Radovic – UPB-MyTeam FC
 Vedran Muratovic – Sarawak FA – 2012
 Boško Balaban – Selangor FA – 2012
 Marco Drakovic – Kelantan FA – 1993
 Vedran Gerc – Kedah FA – 2012
 Lek Kcira – Kelantan – 2013
 Ivan Babic – Sarawak, (Negeri Sembilan), (DRB-Hicom) – 2013, 2014, 2015
 Karlo Primorac – Sime Darby, (PKNS) – 2013, 2014
 Goran Perak – Sime Darby – 2013
 Mateo Roskam – Sime Darby - 2014, (Sarawak FA) - 2017-18, (UKM F.C.) - 2019-
 Alen Guć – Public Service Commission - 2014
 Predrag Pocuca – Sabah - 2014
 Srdan Vidakovic – Kuantan - 2016
 Igor Cerina – Sabah FA - 2016-18

Czech Republic

 Michal Vana – Sabah FA
 Martin Vana
 Jan Janostak – Kedah FA – 1994–96
 Pavel Korejcik – Selangor FA – 1990–91
 Jan Necas
 Kresimir Bozic – Selangor FA – 1989
 Karel Stromsik – Selangor FA – 1989–91

Denmark

 Thomas Abel – Kedah FA – 2002–03
 Philip Lund – DRB-Hicom – 2016-

England

 Tony Cottee – Selangor FA – 1996–97
 Gareth Naven – Sarawak FA – 1995
 Chris Kiwomya – Selangor FA – 1997
 Jon Bass – Pahang FA – 2005
 David Rocastle – Sabah FA – 1999
 Paul Bastock – Sabah FA – 1989
 Carl Hoddle – Negeri Sembilan FA – 1986
 Nicky Walsh – Negeri Sembilan FA – 1986
 Steven Paul Stott – Kuala Lumpur FA – 1996
  Chris Dawson – Kuala Lumpur FA – 2002
 James Rodwell – Sabah FA – 1989
 Alex Smith – Negeri Sembilan Matrix – 2016-

France

 Philippe N'Dioro – Kedah FA – 1995
 David Le Bras – Kelantan FA – 2008
 Abdulfatah Safi – Kedah FA – 2012
 Karim Rouani – Perak – 2013
 Herold Goulon - Pahang FA - 2019-2020

Germany

 Thomas Hoßmang – Terengganu FA – 1990–91
 Frank Pastor – Terengganu FA – 1990–91
 Markus Steinhauer – Malacca FA, Telekom Melaka FC – 1991–92
 Lorenz Menge – Malacca FA, Telekom Melaka FC – 1991–92
 Lutz Pfannenstiel – Penang FA – 1993–94
 Hendrik Helmke – Sabah FA – 2012
Tim Heubach – Selangor F.C. – 2021

Hungary

 Laszlo Repasi – Perak FA – 1997
 Denez Veczi – Pahang FA – 1997
 Istvan Borsos – Pahang FA – 1997
 János Krecska – Perak FA – 1997–98
 Johsef Duro – Pahang FA – 1998
 Péter Disztl – Selangor FA – 1993
 Zsolt Bucs – Selangor FA, Pahang FA – 1993–94, 1997
 Tamás Koltai
 Péter Kovács – Johor FA
 Péter Vörös – Johor FA
 Gábor Gyepes - Sarawak - 2013

Italy

 Simone Del Nero – (Darul Takzim) – 2012–13
 Davide Grassi – (Sarawak) – 2016-

Kosovo

 Liridon Krasniqi – Kedah – 2015-

Netherlands

 Marlon Ricardo van der Sander – Terengganu
 Andreas Sebastian Romano
 George Boateng – Kuala Terengganu Titans – 2013
 Ronald Hikspoors - Sarawak - 2015

Ireland
 Caleb Folan – Kuala Terengganu Titans – 2013
 Billy Mehmet – Kedah, Sarawak – 2013-14, 2015

Macedonia
 Nikolce Klečkarovski – (Pahang) – 2013
 Baže Ilijoski – (Kelantan) – 2016
 Zlatko Nastevski – (Kedah FA)

Montenegro
 Milan Purović – (Perak), (Kuantan) – 2014, 2015
 Ivan Fatić – (Sarawak) – 2015
 Balša Božović – (Melaka) – 2016-
 Ilija Spasojević – (Melaka) – 2016-

Portugal
 Jaime Bragança - (PDRM) - 2015
 Tiago Gomes - (Melaka) - 2018

Russia

 Vyacheslav Melnikov – Penang FA, Pahang FA – 2004–06
 Fail Nizamovich - 1996
 Roman Khagba – Malacca FA – 1994–95
 Boris Ovcin – Penang FA
 Boris Kochkin – Pahang FA, (Penang Water Supply Board) – 2012, 2014
 Eduard Sakhnevich – Pahang FA – 2012

Romania
 Victoraș Astafei – Selangor FA – 2017
 Cristian Fedor – Penang FA – 2004
 Cristian Mustaca – Selangor FA – 1996
 Alexandru Tudose – Melaka United, Kuantan FA – 2016, 2018–
 Petrișor Voinea – PDRM FA – 2018–2019

Scotland

 Brian Bothwell – Brunei FA
 John Hunter – Sarawak FA, Penang FA

Serbia

 Saša Branežac – Petaling Jaya City, Penang, UPB-Myteam FC – 2004, 2006, 2008
 Zoran Nikolić – Kuala Lumpur FA – 1991–93
 Anto Grabo – Kuala Lumpur FA – 1992
 Perica Ognjenović – Selangor FA – 2006
 Dalibor Dragić – Sabah, Johor Bahru City – 2008, 2012
 Lazar Popović – Perak FA – 2011–12
 Peter Bazic – Penang FA
 Bojan Miladinović - (Felda United) 2015-
 Ljubo Baranin - (Kuantan) - 2016-

Slovakia

 Ivan Ziga – MK Land FC, Public Bank FC, Malacca FA, Sarawak FA – 2003–04, 2004–2005, 2005–06, 2006
 Marian Juhas – Negeri Sembilan FA
 Patrik Volf – Malacca FA
 Richard Privitzer – Malacca FA
 Tibor Szaban – Kedah FA – 1992–95
 Karel Stromšík
 Milan Strelec
 Miroslav Hrdina
 Roman Chmelo
 Miroslav Toth
 Marcel Horky
 Michal Kubala – Perak FA, Selangor – 2011–12, 2012–13
 Lubomir Horochonic – Kuala Lumpur FA – 2003
 Martin Filipak – Kuala Lumpur FA – 2003
 Ján Šafranko – Penang FA
 Marian Farbak – Negeri Sembilan FA – 2012
 Tomáš Chovanec – Betaria – 2013
 Vladislav Palša – Kuala Lumpur – 2013
 Peter Chrappan – Selangor – 2013
 Juraj Kuhajdík – Kuala Lumpur – 2013

Slovenia

 Emir Dzafič – (Malacca FA) – 2001–2004
 Nejc Potokar – (Pahang) – 2016
 Dalibor Volaš – (Pahang) – 2016

Sweden

 Labinot Harbuzi – (Malacca United) - 2016-

Spain

 Carlos Rodriguez Villalba – Penang FA – 1997
 Juan Manuel Rodriguez – Negeri Sembilan FA -1990-
 Daniel Guiza – Darul Takzim – 2012–13
 Braulio Nóbrega - Johor Darul Takzim II - 2013
 Jose Manuel Carrasco Correa - Johor Darul Takzim II - 2013-14
 José Franco Gómez - Kedah - 2013
 Rufino Segovia - Selangor FA - 2017 -

Wales

 Jeff Hopkins – Selangor – 1997–98
 Rhys Weston – Sabah – 2012–13

Yugoslavia

 Goran Stanković – Kedah FA – 1990
 Bratislav Rinčić – Kedah FA – 1989–90
 Marko Kraljević – Kelantan 1991–1993, Kedah
 Miladin Kuc – Kuala Lumpur FA – 1991

North America, Central America & Caribbean – CONCACAF

Grenada 
 Antonio German

Canada

 Earl Cochrane – (Penang)
 Issey Nakajima-Farran - (Terengganu  & Pahang) - 2015-2017,2018

Jamaica

 Teafore Bennett–(Pahang) – 2006-2007
 Kevin Lamey–(Kuala Lumpur & Pahang) – 2006-2007, 2007
 Damion Stewart – (Pahang & Perlis) – 2013-2015,2017

Netherlands Antilles

  Brutil Hosé

Saint Vincent and the Grenadines

 Cornelius Huggins
 Marlon James – MK Land 2004-2005, (Kedah) 2006-2008, (ATM) 2012-2013
 Shandel Samuel

Saint Kitts and Nevis

 Keith Gumbs
 Ian Lake-(Sabah FA)

South America – CONMEBOL

Argentina

 Bruno Sebastian Martelotto – MPPJ FC, Armed Forces, Negeri Sembilan Matrix – 2003–05, 2011–14, 2015
 Edurado Alberto Escobar
 Gaston Felipe Stang – Kedah FA – 2004
 Gustavo Fuentes – Public Bank 2004-2005, Malacca FA 2005-2006, Johor FC 2007-2008
 Juan Manuel Arostegui – MPPJ FC, Armed Forces - 2003-05, 2013–14
 Leonardo Adrian Veron – Kedah FA – 2004
 Walter Ariel Silva – Perak FA
 Luciano Goux – Perak FA
 Ricardo Adrian Silva
 Brian Fuentes – Selangor FA – 2004–06
 Jose Luis Iriarte- Pahang FA, Negeri Sembilan FA – 1996
 Alberto Naves- Pahang FA – 1996
 Raul Daniel Cojan
 Gaston Marcel Conlon
 Pablo Cesar Villa
 Jorge Armando Rodriguez
 Hugo Daniel Lucena
 Gustavo Romero – Penang FA
 Aldo Andrés Mores
 Diego Rubén Cepeda – Selangor FA – 2004
 Diego Alberto Albertini
 Fabrizio Rene Franceschi – MPPJ FC
 José Nadalich – Telekom Melaka FC
 Sebastián Omar Monesterollo – MPPJ FC
 Carlos Augusto Quiñonez – Kuala Lumpur FA, Police FA – 2006-06, 2007–08
 Lucas Ariel Cominelli- Pahang FA – 2005
 Fernando Horacio Spinelli- Pahang FA – 2005
 Luis Pablo Pozzuto – Kelantan FA
 Norberto Dario Decoud – Kuala Lumpur FA – 1997
 Gustavo Roberto Chena- Perlis FA
 Emerson Mariano Panigutti – Kuala Lumpur FA – 2003
 Hector Federico Carballo – Kuala Lumpur FA – 2005
 Juan Marcelo Cirelli – Kuala Lumpur FA – 2007–08
 Alex Daniel Cabrera – Penang FA
 Matías Favano – Felda United FC – 2011–12
 Santiago Bianchi – Felda United FC – 2012
 Muriel Orlando – Johor United – 2012-13
 Emanuel De Porras – Negeri Sembilan – 2012-13
 Leonel Nunez - Johor Darul Takzim - 2013
 Pablo Aimar - Johor Darul Takzim - 2013-2014
 Luciano Figueroa - Johor Darul Takzim - 2013-15
 Nicolás Delmonte - Johor Darul Takzim II -2013-
 Gonzalo Garavano - Perlis - 2013
 Jorge Pereyra Díaz - Johor Darul Takzim - 2014, 2015-
 Matías Conti - Pahang - 2013-2015
 Gustavo López - Terengganu - 2015-
 Leandro Velázquez - Johor Darul Takzim II -2015
 Gabriel Guerra - PKNS -2015-
 Gonzalo Soto - PKNS -2015-
 Germán Pacheco - Pahang -2015-
 Matias Cordoba - Penang -2015-
 Juan Manuel Cobelli - PKNS -2016-

Brazil

 Andre Luis Almeida do Nascimento – Kedah FA – 1996–98
 Carlos Robeiro
 Christopher Selbach Kiko
 Joao Bandoch- Telekom Melaka FC, Perlis FA
 Jose Luis Camineiro da Silva
 Jose Ramirez Barreto
 Marco Antonio Manso – Kedah FA – 2004
 Marcos Tavares – Kedah FA – 2004, 2005–06
 Paulo Roberto da Silva Carazinho
 Alysson Marendaz Marins – Perak FA
 Helton Soares – Terengganu FA
 Junior – Sabah FA
 Adilson Roque – Kuala Lumpur FA – 1996–98
 Sharley Lins Miranda – Terengganu FA
 Fabio Flor de Azevedo – Terengganu FA, Kuala Terengganu 2005–08, 2013–14
 Gleisson Freire – Terengganu FA
 Jocian Bento dos Anjos – Terengganu FA
 Jose Luis Vieira
 Adalberto De Souza Squiera- Perlis FA
 Marcelo Padilha da Rocha – Kuala Lumpur FA – 2004
 Emerson Mariano Panigutti – Kuala Lumpur FA – 2003
 Luis Rodrigo Vieira – Kuala Lumpur FA – 2004–05, 2005–06
 Rafael Rodrigues – Kuala Lumpur FA – 2004
 Jurandir dos Santos – Terengganu FA
 Luis Fernando Gomes – Terengganu FA
 Marcos Alexandre – Terengganu FA
 Danilo Vivaldo – Kedah FA – 2011–12
 Daniel Soares Neves – Kedah FA – 2011–12
 Edson Arantes do Nascimento – Penang FA
 Jose Ramirez Barreto – Penang FA
 Mario Da Silva – Penang FA
 Erison da Silva Santos – Terengganu FA – 2011–12
 Fernando de Abreu Ferreira – Johor FC – 2012
 Arthuro Henrique Bernhardt – Johor FC – 2012
 Andrezinho – Johor FA – 2012–13
 Paulo Sergio Ferreira Gomes – PKNS FC – 2012
 Maycon Carvalho Inez – Pahang FA – 2012
 Leandro Teofilo Santos Pinto – Sime Darby FC – 2012
 Eliel – Perak, UiTM – 2013, 2016–
 Junior Aparecido Guimaro de Souza – Selangor – 2013
 Paulo Rangel – Perak, Selangor, Terengganu, Johor Darul Takzim II – 2012–13, 2013–14, 2015, 2016–
 Evaldo Goncalves – Kuala Terengganu FC – 2013
 Márcio Souza – Terengganu – 2013
 Marcos Antonio Elias Santos – Johor Darul Takzim – 2014–
 Marco Tulio – Kuala Terengganu FC, Perak, Sabah United – 2012, 2014, 2016–
 Evaldo Silva dos Santos – Selangor – 2014
 Leandro Dos Santos – Kuala Terengganu, Selangor – 2014, 2015
 Rafael Souza – Police – 2014
 Charles Souza Chad – Police, Perak FA – 2014, 2015
 Luiz Ricardo Lino Dos Santos – Penang – 2014
 Andrezinho – Sabah, Police – 2014, 2016–
 Thiago Junior Aquino – Perak – 2015–
 Guilherme de Paula Lucrécio – Selangor – 2015
 Reinaldo Lobo – Penang – 2015–
 Hilton Moreira – Penang – 2015–
 Beto – Penang – 2015–
 Thiago Augusto Fernandes – Felda United – 2015–
 Casagrande – Kuala Lumpur United – 2016–
 Léo Carioca – Kuala Lumpur United – 2016–
 Matheus Alves - Pahang FA - 2017
 Patrick Cruz - Pahang FA - 2018
 Ze Eduardo - Pahang FA - 2019
 Ivan Carlos - Pahang FA - 2020

Chile

 Christian Carrasco
 Nelson San Martín – Kedah FA, Kuala Terengganu – 2006–08, 2012–13, 2013–14
 Carlos Barraza
 Danilo Miranda
 Antonio Vega
 Mario Berríos – Perak FA – 2007–08
 Jorge Muñoz – Perak FA – 2007–08
 Carlos Cáceres – Perak FA – 2007–08

Colombia

 Erwin Carrillo – Kelantan – 2015
 Romel Morales – (PKNS & Melaka) – 2018-19,2020

Paraguay

 Jorge Armando Rodriguez Arguello – Kuala Lumpur FA – 2005–07
 Facundo Martin Arguello – Kuala Lumpur FA – 2005–06
 Hugo Daniel Lucena – Kuala Lumpur FA 2006–07
 Diego Antonio Mendieta – Johor FA
 Osvaldo Moreno – Johor FA

Uruguay

 Julio Rodriguez
 Luis Fernando Espindola – Public Bank, Malacca FA – 2005, 2006
 Ocampos Otelo Espinola – Johor FA

Oceania – OFC

Fiji

 Esala Masi – Johor FC – 2005

New Zealand

 Neil Jones – Kuala Lumpur FA – 2006
 Chris Zoricich – Sabah FA 
 Kayne Vincent – Perlis – 2016
 Shane Smeltz – Kedah – 2016

References

Malaysia
Association football player non-biographical articles